Manuela Maleeva-Fragniere was the defending champion but did not compete that year.

Martina Navratilova won in the final 6–2, 5–7, 6–1 against Helena Suková.

Seeds
A champion seed is indicated in bold text while text in italics indicates the round in which that seed was eliminated. The top eight seeds received a bye to the second round.

  Martina Navratilova (champion)
  Conchita Martínez (third round)
  Helena Suková (final)
  Jana Novotná (third round)
  Katerina Maleeva (semifinals)
  Hana Mandlíková (third round)
  Larisa Neiland (second round)
  Rosalyn Fairbank-Nideffer (quarterfinals)
  Gigi Fernández (third round)
  Gretchen Magers (third round)
  Amy Frazier (semifinals)
  Judith Wiesner (third round)
  Catarina Lindqvist (second round)
  Claudia Porwik (third round)
 n/a
  Patty Fendick (first round)

Draw

Finals

Top half

Section 1

Section 2

Bottom half

Section 3

Section 4

References
 1990 Virginia Slims of Indian Wells Draw (Archived 2009-07-28)

Virginia Slims of Indian Wells - Singles